Claire Delannoy is a French writer and literary director. She is the Director of a series at Editions Albin Michel where she published Amélie Nothomb, Assia Djebar, and François Cheng. In 2003, she published her first novel, La Guerre, l'Amérique which was awarded the prix Goncourt du premier roman.

Work 
2003: La Guerre, l'Amérique,   — prix Goncourt du premier roman
2004: La Conquête de l'Est, Mercure de France 
2005: Lettre à un jeune écrivain (essay),  
2008: Remember Me,  
2015: Méfiez-vous des femmes exceptionnelles, Albin Michel

References

External links 
 Méfiez-vous des femmes exceptionnelles on Albin Michel
 La "Lettre à un jeune écrivain" de Claire Delannoy aux impétrants scripteurs  on L'Internaute
 Méfiez-vous des femmes exceptionnelles - Claire Delannoy on YouTube

21st-century French non-fiction writers
Prix Goncourt du Premier Roman recipients
Delannoy, Claire
21st-century French women writers
Year of birth missing (living people)
20th-century births